Timothy George Fay is a retired American lieutenant general in the United States Air Force who last served as the Director of Staff of the United States Air Force from April 2020 to July 2021. Prior to this, he was the deputy chief of staff for strategy, integration and requirements. 

Fay was commissioned after graduation from the United States Air Force Academy in 1987. His retirement ceremony was held on July 6, 2021, with an effective date of September 1, 2021.

Awards and decorations

References

 

 
 

 

Living people
1960s births
Year of birth uncertain
Recipients of the Air Force Distinguished Service Medal
Recipients of the Defense Superior Service Medal
Recipients of the Legion of Merit